SOOG may refer to

 Saint-Georges-de-l'Oyapock Airport
 Sochi Olympic Organizing Committee